The Worshipful Company of Goldsmiths, commonly known as the Goldsmiths' Company and formally titled The Wardens and Commonalty of the Mystery of Goldsmiths of the City of London, is one of the Great Twelve Livery Companies of the City of London. The company's headquarters are at Goldsmiths' Hall, London EC2.

The company, which originates from the twelfth century, received a Royal Charter in 1327 and ranks fifth in the order of precedence of City Livery Companies. Its motto is Justitia Virtutum Regina, Latin for Justice is Queen of Virtues.

History

The company was first established as a medieval guild for the goldsmith trade. The word hallmarking derives from the fact that precious metals were officially inspected and marked at Goldsmiths' Hall.
 

In 1812, twenty almshouses were built on the former Perryn estate in Acton, on open land west of London. The almshouses were built on land which had been left to the company by John Perryn in 1657.

In 1891, the Goldsmiths' Company founded the Goldsmiths' Technical and Recreative Institute, which went on to become Goldsmiths, University of London.

Today, the company is one of the few Livery Companies still to play a formal role in its ancient trade. The Goldsmiths' Company oversees The Goldsmiths' Company Assay Office, where objects made of precious metals are tested for purity, and then marked with an official symbol should they pass the necessary tests. At the Trial of the Pyx, the Goldsmiths' Company is also responsible for checking the validity of British coinage.

List of recent Prime Wardens
1950: W. Godfrey Allen
1951: W. Godfrey Allen
2004: Bryan Toye
2008: Grant Macdonald
2012: Hector Miller
2013: Richard Agutter
2014: William Parente
2015: Dr Timothy Schroder
2016: Michael Wainwright
2017: Judith Cobham-Lowe
2018: Michael Prideaux
2019: Timothy Schroder
2020: Richard Fox
2021: Dame Lynne Brindley
2022: The Lord Bridges (695th)

Goldsmiths' Centre

In 2012 the Goldsmiths’ Centre, a space for workshops, exhibitions and events, and education including apprentice training, opened in Clerkenwell.

Current activities
In July 2017, the Goldsmiths' Company announced it was to become a founding partner of the new Museum of London, donating £10 million to the new site. It also announced a contribution of £250,000 to Westminster Abbey for the Queen's Diamond Jubilee Galleries, which opened in 2018.

The Goldsmiths’ Company supported two large educational initiatives, providing funding for a science initiative in primary schools created by Imperial College London and the National Theatre’s programme of streamed recordings for primary schools.

See also
 Harache family

Further reading

 Lisa Jefferson (ed.). 2023. The Register of the Goldsmiths' Company: Deeds and Documents, c. 1190 to c. 1666, Vol. 1–3. Boydell and Brewer.

References

External links

 The Goldsmiths' Company
 The Goldsmiths' Centre

Great Twelve City Livery Companies
12th-century establishments in England
1327 establishments in England
1870s in London
Livery companies
Corporatism
Companies of medieval England
Charities based in London
History of the City of London